The Bukey Horde, also known as the Inner Horde or Interior Horde was an autonomous Khanate of Kazakhs located north of the Caspian Sea in between the Ural and Volga Rivers, but never reaching these rivers. The khanate officially existed from 1801 to 1845, when the position of khan was abolished and the area was fully absorbed into the administration of the Russian Empire. It was located in the western part of modern-day Kazakhstan. Its lands spread over about 71,000 square kilometers.

History

Background 
The population consisted primarily from 5 thousand families of Junior Juz. In the mid-19th century, the population grew to 200 thousand people.

It was named after sultan Bokei Nuralyuly.

In 1756 the Russians attempted to ban the Kazakhs from crossing the Ural River, partly to help the Bashkirs. This was difficult to enforce, given Russia's limited resources in the area. There were numerous illegal crossings and conflicts with the Ural Cossacks. In 1771, following the Kalmyck exodus to Dzungaria, the area became depopulated. The Russians attempted to confine the remaining Kalmyks west of the Volga. From 1782 the Russians permitted Nur Ali and his family, and later some other groups, to cross the Ural legally. In 1801, Russia allowed Nur Ali's son Sultan Bukey, along with some 7,500 families from the Junior jüz to reside permanently in the "Inner Side", as the western side of the Ural was known. After the death of Bukey Sultan, Shygai Khan became the new khan from 1819 to 1823, followed by Zhangir Khan from 1823 to 1845.

Zhangir Khan's reforms 
Zhangir, as a person who adopted some of the habits and tastes of the Russian nobility, was a literate and educated person, and upon becoming the khan of the Bukey Horde, he immediately begins to reform it.

By the letter of Alexander I in 1823, Zhangir was officially recognized as the Khan of the Bukey Horde. In 1824, a ceremony was held to raise him to the rank of khan. By 1827 he began the reform of the bureaucratic apparatus - the Khan's Council was created, in which each large clan was elected by foreman. In the 1820s–1830s.  he campaigned to centralize his power and create power structures.  The power of the sultans was limited, now they were directly elected by the khan, at the end of the reign, almost all the sultans were elected by Janger himself. He himself appointed foremen of the heads of departments of childbirth. Zhangir voluntarily determined the powers of elders and sultans to maintain order, collect taxes and promote trade.

Under him, a system of so-called "esauls" was organized - people acting to entrust special assignments and "bazar sultans" - controlling order where constant trade was carried out.  Zhangir created a special office with two departments: Tatar and Russian.  The first was intended for internal affairs, and the second for relations with the Russian authorities.

The transition to a sedentary lifestyle was encouraged: the creation of farms by the Kazakhs, mowing and forestry, the import of agricultural implements, and the development of local breeds of livestock. The Khan himself formed the first permanent settlements on the territory of the Horde: in 1827 he founded the settlement of Khan-Kala (Khanskaya Stavka), and in 1841 - the summer headquarters of Tor-gun-Kala. The khanate supported barter and commercial entrepreneurship. Since 1833, a large annual fair was held at the Khanskaya Stavka, in which Russian merchants also participated. This fair promoted trade and economic ties between the Kazakhs of the Bukey Horde and other European regions of Russia.

Zhangir allocated significant funds for the reform of education in the Horde, in 1841 he opened a secular general education school for Kazakh children in the Khanskaya Stavka. At the same time, Islam actively developed in the Khanate, he built mektebs in the villages, and madrasahs in the Khan's Headquarters.

The best pasture lands Zhangir distributed the family property of the Kazakh nobility, which caused great discontent throughout the Bukey Horde.

From 1836 to 1838, under the command of Isatay Taymanuly and famous akyn Makhambet Otemisuly, an uprising against the rule of Zhangir Khan occurred in the region. The uprising was eventually suppressed.

In 1845, following the death of Zhangir Khan, the position of khan was abolished and the area gradually came under Russian civil administration.

Notes

References
 Kasymbaev, Zh. K. 8 klass - Istoriia Kazakhstana (XVIII vek-1914). (Almaty: Mektep) 2004.

See also
Turkic peoples
List of Turkic dynasties and countries
List of Turkic states and empires
 Kazakh khanate
 Kazakhstan in the Russian Empire
 List of Kazakh khans

Turkic dynasties
Kazakhstan in the Russian Empire
Astrakhan Governorate